The 2009 Selangor FA Season is Selangor FA's 4th season playing soccer in the Malaysia Super League Since its inception in 2004.

Selangor FA began the season on 10 January 2009. They will also compete in two domestic cups; The FA Cup Malaysia and Malaysia Cup.

Malaysia Super League

Malaysia FA Cup

First round
Selangor had a first round bye.

Second round
The first leg match played on 21 February 2009. The second leg will be play on 24 February 2009.

Quarter-final
The quarter final matches are scheduled to be played on 3 March and the weekend of 7 March 2009.

First leg

Second leg

Selangor advance 4–1 on aggregate

Semi-final

The first leg matches were played on Tuesday, 7 April 2009, while the second legs were played on Tuesday, 18 April 2009.

First leg

Second leg

Selangor FA advance 3–2 on aggregate

Final

The final was played at National Stadium, Bukit Jalil, Kuala Lumpur, on Saturday, 25 April 2009.

Selangor FA win 4–1 on penalties

Malaysia Cup

Group stage

Group D

Knockout stage

Bracket

References

Selangor
Selangor FA